Konarzew may refer to the following places:
Konarzew, Greater Poland Voivodeship (west-central Poland)
Konarzew, Łęczyca County in Łódź Voivodeship (central Poland)
Konarzew, Zgierz County in Łódź Voivodeship (central Poland)

See also
 Konarzewo (disambiguation)